Virginijus Praškevičius (born 4 March 1974) is a Lithuanian former professional basketball player. At a height of 2.06 m (6'9") tall, he played at the power forward and center positions.

Professional career
Praškevičius started playing with Banga Kaunas and in 1993–94 was bought by Lavera Kaunas. In 1995–96 decided to play for Atletas Kaunas together with Žydrūnas Ilgauskas. In January 1997 he passed to LaCrosse Bobcats in the Continental Basketball Association. On 18 September 1996, he signed with the Minnesota Timberwolves of National Basketball Association (NBA). However, Praškevičius did not play a single game for them and was loaned to the LaCrosse Bobcats of the Continental Basketball Association (CBA). On 19 February 1997, he was waived by the Timberwolves.

In 1997–98 he came back to his home town Kaunas to play for Atletas and then for Žalgiris. With the best Lithuanian team he won a Saporta Cup. Then he played two years for Beşiktaş Spor Kulubu in the Turkish Basketball League. In 2000 he passed to Basketball Club Oostende in Belgium, winning twice the Belgian National Championship and becoming once the MVP of the league. From 2002 until 2005 he played for Ülkerspor (but played for Hapoel Tel Aviv for one season), and he won twice the Turkish National Cup.

In 2005–06 he played for Upea Capo d'Orlando, in Italian Serie A1, in 2006–07 for Baloncesto Fuenlabrada in the Spanish ACB. His last professional team was Utena Juventus in Lithuania as he left professional sport on spring of 2010 at the age of 36.

National team career
Praškevičius played with the Lithuania Under-22 junior national team. With Lithuania's junior national team, he won the gold medal at the 1996 FIBA Europe Under-20 Championship. He was also a member of the senior Lithuanian national team. He played at the EuroBasket 1997, the 1998 FIBA World Championship, the EuroBasket 1999, and the 2003, where he won a gold medal.

Career statistics

EuroLeague

|-
| style="text-align:left;"| 2001–02
| style="text-align:left;"| Telindus Ostende
| 14 || 14 || 29.4 || .456 || .325 || .721 || 6.1 || 1.1 || .9 || .5 || 15.9 || 13.0
|-
| style="text-align:left;"| 2002–03
| style="text-align:left;"| Ülkerspor
| 20 || 19 || 28.4 || .473 || .449 || .625 || 4.6 || 1.6 || .9 || .2 || 10.7 || 10.4
|-
| style="text-align:left;"| 2004–05
| style="text-align:left;"| Ülkerspor
| 22 || 5 || 17.2 || .428|| .403 || .583 || 3.1 || .6 || .6 || .0 || 5.4 || 4.9
|- class="sortbottom"
| style="text-align:left;"| Career
| style="text-align:left;"|
| 56 || 38 || 24.9 || .457 || .403 || .676 || 4.4 || 1.1 || .8 || .2 || 9.9 || 8.9

References

External links 
 ACB.com - Player Profile 
 TBLStat.net - Player Profile

1974 births
Living people
Basketball players from Kaunas
Baloncesto Fuenlabrada players
BC Oostende players
BC Žalgiris players
Beşiktaş men's basketball players
FIBA EuroBasket-winning players
Hapoel Tel Aviv B.C. players
Israeli Basketball Premier League players
Liga ACB players
Lithuanian men's basketball players
LSU-Atletas basketball players
Power forwards (basketball)
Ülker G.S.K. basketball players
1998 FIBA World Championship players